Jacob Harris may refer to:

 Jacob Harris (cricketer), Pakistani cricketer
 Jacob Harris (American football) (born 1997), American football tight end
 Jacob Brown Harris (1830–1875), American lawyer and politician
 Jacob Harris Miller (born 1992), American singer, songwriter and rapper